The Kota Bridge or Kota Chambal or Kota Cable Bridge is a cable-stayed bridge in Kota, Rajasthan. The bridge was inaugurated by Prime Minister of India Narendra Modi on 29 August 2017. The bridge is a part of the Kota Bypass and crosses the Chambal River in the outskirts of the city.

Funding
The project is being sponsored by the National Highways Authority of India (NHAI) in a 2750 million INR investment on the bridge and a 40 months-deadline. The agreement was signed in 2006. Due to delay in Environmental and Wild life clearances it could start in 2007 only. The bridge was scheduled to be opened in November 2012. Later this was pushed to May 2017. It is being constructed by Hyundai Engineering (HEC) of South Korea.

Structure 
This bridge is cable-stayed with single plain suspension with the main span of 350 metres and lateral spans of 175 metres on either side of the bridge. The bridge is around 60-metre-high from the surface of the Chambal River. Kota's Iconic Engineering Marvel open for commuters on 29 August 2017.

Accident
On 24 December 2009, at about 5.30 pm the under-construction west side of the bridge comprising span P4-P3, Pilon P4, Pier P4 and cantilever portion up to segment 10 (each segment being 3.5 meters) collapsed into the river below without any warning signs, killing 48 workers and engineers and injuring a few more.

References

Cable-stayed bridges in India
Kota, Rajasthan
Buildings and structures in Kota, Rajasthan
Bridges in Rajasthan